The 2004-05 season of the Belgian First Division began on August 6, 2004 and ended on May 23, 2005.  Club Brugge became champions on May 15, 2005 after a decisive game against long-time rivals Anderlecht.  The season was full of suspense as the champions and the relegated teams were only known on the 33rd (on 34) matchday.  Furthermore, the 3rd place (qualifying for UEFA Cup) had to be decided on a test-match, a fact that had not occurred recently.

Promoted teams

These teams were promoted from the second division at the start of the season:
FC Brussels (second division champion)
Oostende (playoff winner)

Relegated teams
These teams were relegated to the second division at the end of the season:
Oostende
Mons

Battle for the 1st place
As usual, the two giants (Sporting Anderlecht and Club Brugge) were occupying the first two places after 5 matches.  Brugge was already 1st and actually stayed on top until the end.  The Brussels side has indeed failed to show consistency under the management of Hugo Broos who was fired after a 0-0 draw at Gent.  Under new coach (Franky Vercauteren), Anderlecht had a run of good form (after the initial 0-1 defeat against Oostende).  Linked to the poor results of rivals Brugge, this situation led to a 6-point difference between the two clubs after 32 matches.  The Brugge-Anderlecht game (33rd matchday) was thus decisive for both clubs.  It ended with a 2-2 draw that was sufficient for the West Flemish.

Brugge title is due to its exceptional regularity against smaller teams as is shown on the following table (showing points gained by a top 4 team against the other top 4 teams) :

1. Anderlecht 6 13
2. Standard   6  8
3. Brugge     6  6
4. Genk       6  5

Battle for Europe
As Anderlecht and Brugge rapidly ran away with the first two places, the battle for Europe was mainly consisted in the battle for UEFA Cup spots (or battle for the third place).  Four teams were serious candidates: Standard, Genk, Charleroi and Gent.  The latter two were soon dismissed.  Before the last matchday, Standard was two points ahead of Genk but they lost their advantage after a 1-1 draw at Ostend while Genk earned a 3-1 win at Cercle Brugge.  As both teams now had the same number of points and wins, a test-match had to be played (in two legs).  Standard won the first match 3-1 but lost the away match 0-3 and lost the European ticket for next season.

The relegation dog fight
After their poor early results, five teams were predicted to fight against relegation: Sint-Truiden, Mouscron and especially newcomers FC Brussels and Oostende along with Mons.  Beveren joined the list after a very poor final run.  Before the 33rd matchday, the table read:

12. Lierse        32  35
13. Sint-Truiden  32  33
14. Beveren       32  31
15. Mouscron      32  30
16. Brussels      32  30
17. Mons          32  26
18. Oostende      32  26

Lierse and Sint-Truiden were already saved.  Mons and Oostende had to win or draw to maintain suspense but they finally both lost (2-0 respectively against Mouscron and at La Louvière).

Final league table

Results

Top goal scorers

See also
2004-05 in Belgian football

References
 Sport.be website - Archive

Belgian Pro League seasons
Belgian
1